Meterana exquisita is a species of moth in the family Noctuidae. This species is endemic to New Zealand. It is classified as "At Risk, Relict'" by the Department of Conservation.

Taxonomy 
This species was first described and illustrated by Alfred Philpott in 1903 and was given the name Melanchra exquisita. Philpott used a male specimen he collected at West Plains in Southland in December. George Hudson discussed and illustrated this species in his 1928 book The Butterflies and Moths of New Zealand. In 1988 John S. Dugdale placed this species within the genus Meterana. The hototype specimen is held at the New Zealand Arthropod Collection.

Description 
The larvae of this species are large, angular and green coloured with thin red and white lines.

Philpott originally described the male of the species as follows:

Distribution 
This species is endemic to New Zealand. M. exquisita has occurred in Auckland, Waikato, Taupo, Whanganui, Wairarapa, Nelson, South Canterbury, Mackenzie country, Central Otago, Otago Lakes and Southland. However this species is now locally extinct in its type locality of West Plains and is almost wiped out in Auckland.

Life cycle and behaviour 
This species has only one generation a year. The larvae are bright green coloured and as a result are well camouflaged when feeding on their host species. Larvae feed for one month before they pupate. M. exquisita are on the wing from August to December but are most common from September to October. The species can fly for at least 800m from their nearest host plant. This species has been collected at sugar traps.

Host species and habitat 

The plant host species for the larvae of M. exquisita are small-leaved Olearia species. These include O. hectorii, O. odorata, and O. bullata.

Conservation status 
This moth is classified under the New Zealand Threat Classification system as being "At Risk, Relict". One of the reasons for this classification is that the habitat of this species is under threat from land development. The elimination of the host plants of this species has resulted in their extinction from sites in New Zealand.

References

External links

 page 76 Image of M. exquisita larvae

Moths of New Zealand
Endemic fauna of New Zealand
Moths described in 1903
Xyloryctinae
Endangered biota of New Zealand
Endemic moths of New Zealand